Timelie is a 2020 single-player stealth puzzle adventure game developed by Urnique Studio. The story follows a young woman who awakens in an unfamiliar dimension and is threatened by hostile robots. The player can control time in the form of a media player, which can be used to defeat enemies. The game was released for Windows and macOS in May 2020 and went on to sell over thirty thousand copies, being nominated for multiple accolades and awards. Thai gaming publications and conventions listed Timelie as Game of the Year. The first free DLC Hell Loop Puzzle Pack was released in October 2020.

Plot 
A little girl and her companion cat, lost in nowhere, trying to overcome obstacles to find a way out of this mysterious abstract realm using their power to control time.

When a child awakes in the middle of a mysterious facility full of hostile robots, she begins looking for a quick exit. Along the way, the innocent girl discovers she has precognitive powers that allow her to explore future timelines until she discovers the optimal route to safety.

The game's story is told in a pantomime style with no voice acting. Much of the game's story is hinted at through symbols displayed along the bridge in each chapter. The end of the game shows the characters waking up in bed in a scene similar to the room when they first woke up in. Additionally, in the endgame expansion, the character walks out of the laboratory room and meets an orange-haired boy who resembles the cat encountered in the game.

Gameplay 
The game's narrative is non-linear, meaning no timecode clearly defines what will happen and when. But, open to the player to decide which each player spends a different amount of time playing or reacting to the game.

As for playing in each scene, it will solve the mystery with the power to predict the future. Players need to watch how the enemies in the scene move during that time. They can go back in time and watch it all as if watching a video. Wait carefully that this moment the enemy will turn this way. Then control the character to be able to press the button to open the door or collect special powerballs to use them to build your way forward or sometimes have to move the moment before the scene collapses. It takes both intelligence and wit to pass each level, which is set to become more difficult accordingly.

In addition to the girl's character in the game, players will also be able to control other characters such as cats with different abilities. It can emit a sound to lure enemies into their attention and run through vents. Combining the abilities of the two characters is essential for solving the puzzles in the second half of the game.

Development 
Timelie game started from a senior project before going to the contest and winning the "Best Game" in the National Software Contest, and also representing Thailand to win the "Best Game" award in the international Microsoft Imagine Cup Competition.

Thai indie game created by Urnique Studio from Thailand. In the beginning development team had only a group of five students in the Faculty of Computer Engineering, Chulalongkorn University. The project (Timelie) happened the day they had to finish the project with more people than any other group. Advisor wants their work to be more special than others. Therefore, aiming to reach the national program competition which in the end their work has finally caught up with Microsoft Thailand.

At Microsoft's 2016 Imagine Cup, Timelie's name became instantly recognizable after winning the first prize in the event. It is the first honourable award received during the game that is not yet developed to the maximum. Indicates the potential of the game that may go further than everyone expected.

Since 2018, the game has been continuously developed by Urnique Studio in terms of the game system, storyline, characters, graphics, sound design. and background music. Currently, Timelie is a puzzle, semi-stealth game where players control two characters a girl and a cat to help them escape safely from a mysterious place. The highlight of the game is that there will be a time bar at the bottom for players to control the time. Can scan to the future or go back to correct past mistakes like watching YouTube video.

Design 
As Timelie games are based on the story of time and the journey of a girl and a cat, the game's template design includes travel sounds such as orchestra and choirs. Sounds that reflect mystical locations in the game such as ambience and synth. Personality sounds with the mood of characters such as piano, harp and music box. It has also adapted the sound of different types of clocks into the soundtrack of the game to symbolize the time.

The concept of design is simple and easy gameplay emphasis on using a few variables in the scene to produce hundreds of thousands of results. By the role of the player is to take the girl character and her trusty cat through the door to the next level. Which the girl said to have special powers, able to go back and forth in time as she wants. Not only affect her position but also affects the objects around her. If she receives an item that meets the game conditions in each scene this ability will be available.

In the first period, the range of variables is not much. Players will have to worry only about the robots chasing them. They will have a clear pattern for learning and catching the right way to pass the level will be fast. But after a while Game variants will start to increase. Players must collect items and remember the enemy patterns that change after their actions, controlling two characters. The game will gradually increase the challenge, forcing players to have to think about how to find a way to survive.

Music 
The sound of the Timelie game consists of 3 parts. The first part is the sound effect made by Angel Ignace, a French sound designer, and teacher. The second part is the promotional song for the game "No Last Eternity" composed and produced by Aun Jetsada Trirungkit, a singer from The Voice TH 2018, with Nutbua Natthaphon as a singer. And the last part is BGM by Pongsathorn Posayanonth, a film music composer.

Release

Announcement 
Initially, the game only supported 5 languages: Thai, English, Simplified Chinese, Traditional Chinese, and Japanese. Later, it came to support 8 more languages: Spanish-Spain, French, German, Italian, Portuguese-Brazil, Korean, Turkish, and Russian.

Downloadable content 
On October 9, 2020, the developers added an expansion content titled TIMELIE: Hell Loop, an expansion that adds 30 new levels. There is no additional storyline. It's just a new level added and will be unlocked for those who have finished playing the main game content. Players can play by the difficulty of solving puzzles that are much more difficult than in the original one. This supplement has been released to those who already have the main game with no additional cost.

Reception

Sales 
The development team Urnique Studio has announced that the PC version of Timelie will be released via Steam in Spring 2020, along with the first gameplay clip. Currently, the game was released through Steam, Epic Games and GOGcom channels. In addition, the game also revealed that there may be plans to develop more DLC, including porting the game to the Nintendo Switch.

Awards 
The first version of the game uses the Unity Engine to develop and has won national and international awards include:
 Best Game from the Microsoft Imagine Cup 2016
 Best Game from the Microsoft Imagine Cup Thailand 2016
 Best Game from the National Software Contest 2016
 Special Award from the National Software Contest 2016
 Best Student Technical Project from the Bangkok International Digital Content Festival 2018
After the process of development and release to the online platform, awards received include:
 Game of The Year from the Bangkok International Digital Contest Festival 2020
 Best of Audio from the Bangkok International Digital Contest Festival 2020
 Best of Visual Art from the Bangkok International Digital Contest Festival 2020
 Best of Game Design from the Bangkok International Digital Contest Festival 2020
 Developers Choice Award from the Bangkok International Digital Contest Festival 2020
 Best Mobile Game from the Taipei Game Show 2020 (Finalist)

Critiques 

The game has received a lot of attention among Thai gamers and received a very positive response as well. Like many review bureaus, the ratings were mostly positive.

References

External links 
 Development team website
 Official website

2020 video games
Adventure games
Linux games
MacOS games
Nintendo Switch games
Puzzle video games
Video games developed in Thailand
Video games featuring female protagonists
Video games with time manipulation
Video games about robots